The 15th World Sports Acrobatics Championships were held in Minsk, Belarus, from October 28 to October 31, 1998.

Men's Tumbling

Overall

Straight

Twist

Men's Group

Overall

Balance

Tempo

Men's Pair

Overall

Balance

Tempo

Mixed Pair

Overall

Balance

Tempo

Women's Group

Overall

Balance

Tempo

Women's Pair

Overall

Balance

Tempo

Women's Tumbling

Overall

Straight

Twist

References

Acrobatic Gymnastics Championships
Acrobatic Gymnastics World Championships
International gymnastics competitions hosted by Belarus
1998 in Belarusian sport